Gianvito Misuraca (born 2 April 1990) is an Italian professional footballer who plays as a forward for  club Fermana on loan from Pordenone.

Club career
He is a product of Palermo youth academy. In 2009, he was sent to Serie B club Vicenza in co-ownership deal for €240,000. Co-currently, Palermo signed 50% registration rights of Nicola Rigoni for €990,000, On 15 November 2009 he made his debut in Serie B in a match against Ancona. He concludes his first professional season with 15 appearances. In June 2010 the co-ownerships were renewed. In June 2012 Vicenza acquired Misuraca outright for free.

In 2013, he was signed by Parma F.C. On 1 August Misuraca, Berardocco, Checcucci, Favalli, Gigli, Vanin and Vicente were signed by Slovenian club ND Gorica in temporary deals from Parma.

On 23 July 2014 Misuraca was signed by A.C. Pisa 1909.

In September 2015 he moved to Bassano; the following year he was bought from Pordenone.

On 31 January 2022, Misuraca joined Bari on loan. On 1 September 2022, Misuraca moved on a new loan to Fermana.

International career
He was part of the Italy U20 squad at the 2009 FIFA U-20 World Cup. On 17 November 2010 he made his debut with the Italy U21 in a friendly game against Turkey. He participated in the 2011 Toulon Tournament with the U21. Misuraca played twice in the tournament. In the 2011–12 season, he was capped twice for the Italy under-21 Serie B representative team.

Honours
Gorica
 Slovenian Football Cup: 2013–14

Bari
 Serie C: 2021–22 (Group C)

References

External links

FIGC  
PrvaLiga profile 

1990 births
Living people
Footballers from Palermo
Italian footballers
Association football forwards
Association football midfielders
Serie B players
Serie C players
Slovenian PrvaLiga players
L.R. Vicenza players
F.C. Grosseto S.S.D. players
Parma Calcio 1913 players
Pisa S.C. players
Bassano Virtus 55 S.T. players
Pordenone Calcio players
ND Gorica players
S.S.C. Bari players
Fermana F.C. players
Italian expatriate footballers
Italian expatriate sportspeople in Slovenia
Expatriate footballers in Slovenia
Italy youth international footballers
Italy under-21 international footballers